Tehrany is a surname. Notable people with the name include:
Armin Tehrany, American orthopedic surgeon
Mahyat Shafapour Tehrany (born 1985), Iranian geomatic engineer